Saša Marjanović (born 13 November 1987) is a Serbian football midfielder who plays for Radnički Niš.

Club career

Čukarički
Born in Niš, Marjanović started his senior career with Čukarički in the Serbian First League. Previously, he was a member of Partizan youth categories. For the 2007–08 season, Čukarički was promoted in the Serbian SuperLiga. On 11 August 2007, Marjanović made his Serbian SuperLiga debut in a 0–0 away draw against Red Star Belgrade. Marjanović spent 4 seasons playing for Čukarički and scored 5 goals during that period.

Jagodina
After left Čukarički, Marjanović joined Jagodina for the 2009–10 season. For the first season, he was usually the first choice, but in the next season he made just 6 appearances because of injury. Later he extended his contract for two years. For the last season with Jagodina, he played 16 league matches with 3 goals and also scored a goal in a cup match against Javor Ivanjica, played on 26 October 2011. On 20 May 2012, Marjanović has score from a free kick to give his team a 1–0 win over Novi Pazar and helping to his team standing in qualifying for UEFA Europa League in next season. During the spring half of the 2011–12 season, he was also nominated as the man of the match once time, in a match against Sloboda Užice.

Sheriff Tiraspol
In summer 2012, Marjanović signed with Sheriff Tiraspol together with Marko Stanojević. He made his debut in Sheriff on 13 July 2012, against Costuleni as a substitute for Alexandru Pașcenco in the 73rd minute. Four days later, Marjanović made his debut in UEFA club competitions playing full 90 minutes against Ulisses and providing one assist in 0–1 away win. Although he did not play constantly, in some interviews he spoke about professionalism at the club. He ended season with total 20 official caps with 1 goal. After 6 months without playing football, he left the club in the winter break off 2013–14 season.

Radnički Niš
Marjanović returned in his hometown beginning of 2014, and signed a one-year deal with club. He made 10 appearances for the spring half of 2013–14 season with just 4 starts. During the 2014–15 season, Marjanović played 27 SuperLiga and scored 5 goals, and also appeared in 2 cup matches. He also stayed with the club in new season, and became one of the most important players in midfield for coach Milan Rastavac, along with Aleksandar Jovanović and Petar Đuričković. As one of the most standard players in squad, Marjanović noted 34 caps with 5 goals until the 28 April 2016 when he scored 5 goals at one match against Radnik Surdulica in 33 fixture of the 2015–16 Serbian SuperLiga season. Marjanović also scored 2 of 5 goals for Radnički in away victory against his ex club, Čukarički on 7 May 2016. In next fixture, he scored a goal for first win of FK Radnički against Partizan on the Čair Stadium after 22 years.

Partizan
Marjanović signed a two-year contract with Partizan on 7 June 2016. He was given the number 17 jersey, previously worn by Andrija Živković. He made his debut for new club on 14 August 2016, replacing Valeri Bojinov in a match against Čukarički. After 8 matches at total he collected under coaches Ivan Tomić and Marko Nikolić in the first half-season, he missed the rest of the campaign in both domestic competitions. He noted his first match in the 2017–18 Serbian SuperLiga season on 9 September 2017 under Miroslav Đukić, after 10 months without competitive matches. In the mid-season, Marjanović mutually terminated the contract with Partizan and left them as a free agent on 10 January 2018.

Aktobe
On 27 February 2018, Marjanović signed a two-year contract with Aktobe.

Career statistics

Honours
Čukarički
Serbian First League: 2006–07
Sheriff Tiraspol
Moldovan National Division (2): 2012–13, 2013–14
Moldovan Super Cup: 2013
Partizan
 Serbian SuperLiga: 2016–17
Serbian Cup: 2016–17

References

External links
 Saša Marjanović stats at utakmica.rs 
 
 
 
 

1987 births
Living people
Sportspeople from Niš
Serbian footballers
FK Jagodina players
FK Čukarički players
FK Radnički Niš players
FK Partizan players
FC Aktobe players
Nea Salamis Famagusta FC players
FK Napredak Kruševac players
FC Sheriff Tiraspol players
Moldovan Super Liga players
Serbian First League players
Serbian SuperLiga players
Serbian expatriate footballers
Serbian expatriate sportspeople in Moldova
Serbian expatriate sportspeople in Kazakhstan
Serbian expatriate sportspeople in Cyprus
Expatriate footballers in Moldova
Expatriate footballers in Kazakhstan
Expatriate footballers in Cyprus
Association football midfielders